The Doncaster Prelude, registered as Royal Parma Stakes is an Australian Turf Club Group 3  Thoroughbred quality handicap horse race, for horses aged three years old and older, over a distance of 1500 metres, held at Rosehill Gardens Racecourse in Sydney. Total prize money for the race is A$160,000.

History
The registered race is named after champion two-year-old Royal Parma, winner of the Golden Slipper Stakes in 1968. 
The race was originally run at Rosehill racecourse on the Golden Slipper Stakes race meeting but after the merging of the two principal race clubs in Sydney the race was moved to a later date and now the race is a prelude to the rich Doncaster Handicap.

Name
1985–1991 - Royal Parma Stakes
1992 - Caravan Stakes
1993–1997 - Royal Parma Stakes
1998 - Concept Sports Stakes
1999–2004 - Royal Parma Stakes
2005 - Allied Express Stakes 
2006–2009 - Royal Parma Stakes
2010 onwards -  Doncaster Prelude

Distance
1985–2000 – 1500 metres
2001–2003 – 1400 metres
2004–2005 – 1500 metres
2006 – 1400 metres
2007 – 1500 metres
2008–2009 – 1400 metres
2010–2013 - 1600 metres
2014 onwards - 1500 metres

Grade
1986–2010 - Listed Race
2011 onwards - Group 3

Venue
1985–2009 - Rosehill Racecourse
2010–2013 - Randwick Racecourse
2014–2021 - Rosehill Racecourse
2022 - Newcastle Racecourse
2023 onwards - Rosehill Racecourse

Winners

 2022 - Mr Mozart
 2021 - Yao Dash 
2020 - Cascadian 
2019 - Mister Sea Wolf
2018 - Cellarman
2017 - Spectroscope
2016 - Havana Cooler
2015 - Excess Knowledge
2014 - Weary
2013 - Skyerush
2012 - Fast Clip
2011 - My Kingdom Of Fife
2010 - Brilliant Light
2009 - Dao Dao
2008 - Valedictum
2007 - Mr Ubiquitous
2006 - Gorgonite
2005 - Osca Warrior
2004 - Allgunadoit
2003 - Helsinborg
2002 - Defier
2001 - Final Fantasy
2000 - Le Zagaletta
1999 - Adam
1998 - Corporate James 
1997 - Ravarda 
1996 - Buzzoff 
1995 - Salivate 
1994 - Cobbora 
1993 - Blue Boss 
1992 - Alderson 
1991 - Livistona Lane
1990 - Painted Ocean
1989 - Card Shark
1988 - Tumble On 
1987 - Eastern Classic
1986 - Swift Cheval  
1985 - Bring Home

See also
 List of Australian Group races
 Group races

External links 
First three placegetters Doncaster Prelude (ATC)

References

Horse races in Australia
Open middle distance horse races